Māris Purgailis (born 8 December 1947, Riga) is a Latvian politician. He was the mayor of Riga from 1994 to 1997.

References

Latvian Way politicians
Latvian National Independence Movement politicians
1947 births
Living people
Mayors of Riga
Riga State Gymnasium No.1 alumni
Academic staff of the University of Latvia
University of Latvia alumni